John R. Helliwell (born 1953, Wickersley, Yorkshire) is a British crystallographer known for his pioneering work in the use of synchrotron radiation in macromolecular crystallography.

Education and career
He studied physics at the University of York and obtained a PhD from the University of Oxford in 1978. For many years he was closely associated with the Synchrotron Radiation Source at Daresbury Laboratory, while also holding positions at the University of Keele, the University of York and the University of Manchester, where he is now an Emeritus Professor.

Awards and honours
In 2014 the American Crystallographic Association awarded Helliwell the A. L. Patterson Award for `his pioneering contributions to the development of the instrumentation, methods and applications of synchrotron radiation in macromolecular crystallography', and in 2015 he was awarded the Max Perutz Prize by the European Crystallographic Association for `his long, generous and fruitful dedication to developing all aspects of the use of synchrotron radiation for crystallography and for his boosting support to global development of synchrotron and neutron facilities'.
John Helliwell was made an Honorary Member of the Slovenian National Institute of Chemistry in 1996, a Fellow of the American Crystallographic Association in 2015, an honorary member of the British Biophysical Society in 2016 and an honorary member of the British Crystallographic Association in 2019.

Bibliography

References

British crystallographers
Living people
British biophysicists
Academics of the University of Manchester
Alumni of the University of Oxford
York University alumni
1953 births